Rhipsalis floccosa is a species of plant in the family Cactaceae. It is found in Argentina, Bolivia, Brazil, Paraguay, Peru, and Venezuela. Its natural habitat is subtropical or tropical moist lowland forest. It is threatened by habitat loss.

References

floccosa
Flora of South America
Flora of Argentina
Flora of Brazil
Flora of the Atlantic Forest
Taxonomy articles created by Polbot